Richard D. Kisling (November 22, 1923 – November 3, 1985) was a senior airman of the United States Air Force who served as the 3rd Chief Master Sergeant of the Air Force from 1971 to 1973.
Richard Kislimg served in the US Army from 1944 to 47.

Military career
Kisling entered the United States Army in July 1944 and served overseas in the European area of World War II with the 3rd Infantry Division and 88th Infantry Division. In April 1947, he re-enlisted in the United States Army Air Corps and was assigned to the Mobile Training Unit, Chanute Field, Illinois. When the United States Air Force became a separate military service in 1947, he transferred to the Air Force and was in the personnel field during most of his subsequent career. In May 1948, he transferred to Hamilton Air Force Base, California, where he served as a personnel clerk, enlisted branch, Headquarters 4th Air Force. He was assigned to the 1261st Air Transport Squadron, Tripoli, Libya, in April 1950 and served as first sergeant.

Kisling returned to the United States in April 1952 and was assigned as first sergeant of the 1707th Food Service Squadron, Palm Beach International Airport, West Palm Beach, Florida. In October 1952 he transferred to Amarillo, Texas, as first sergeant and personnel sergeant major with the 1739th Ferrying Squadron. In February 1954, Kisling was assigned to the Southwest Recruiting District, Fort Sam Houston, Texas. He became sergeant major of the 3504th United States Air Force Recruiting Group, Lackland Air Force Base, Texas in May 1954. In 1956 he was selected as the Outstanding Support Airman of the Year for Air Force Recruiting Service.

Kisling was sent to Chaumont, France, in August 1956 as base personnel sergeant major, 48th Tactical Fighter Wing. In August 1959 he became base personnel sergeant major at Nellis Air Force Base, Nevada, and he was promoted to chief master sergeant on December 1, 1959. He was selected as the Outstanding Airman of the Year for 12th Air Force in 1960. He transferred to March Air Force Base, California, in August 1961 for duty as Tactical Air Command personnel adviser to the 452nd Troop Carrier Wing of the Air Force Reserve. He was assigned as base personnel sergeant major at George Air Force Base, Calif., in September 1962.

In August 1963, Kisling joined the United States Air Force Security Service as personnel sergeant major, European Security Region, Frankfurt, West Germany. In May 1967 he became noncommissioned officer in charge, programs and requirements division, deputy chief of staff, personnel, Headquarters Air Force Security Service, Kelly Air Force Base, Texas. He was selected as the senior airman adviser, Air Force Security Service in September 1969.

Kisling became Chief Master Sergeant of the Air Force on October 1, 1971. In this role he was adviser to Secretary of the Air Force Robert C. Seamans Jr. and Chief of Staff of the Air Force, General John D. Ryan, on matters concerning welfare, effective utilization and progress of the enlisted members of the Air Force. He was the third chief master sergeant appointed to this top noncommissioned officer position. Kisling retired from the Air Force on September 30, 1973.

Later life
Upon his retirement, Kisling continued serving the Air Force as a civil servant, assigned to the Air Staff. He served on the staff of the deputy chief of staff, personnel, from April 1975 through October 1982, and with the staff of the deputy chief of staff, administration, from November 1982 until his retirement from civil service on May 20, 1985. He was awarded the Exceptional Civilian Service Award in May 1985.

Kisling died November 3, 1985, at Malcolm Grow Medical Center, Andrews Air Force Base, Maryland, as a result of amyotrophic lateral sclerosis. His contributions and dedicated service to the Air Force and country spanned more than 40 years—as a leader, a spokesperson and a great friend of the enlisted corps.

In 2004, Kisling Community Center at Lackland Air Force Base, Texas was dedicated to Kisling. The Kisling Noncommisioned Officers Academy located in Vogelweh, Germany is also named after him.

Awards and decorations

References

United States Army personnel of World War II
Chief Master Sergeants of the United States Air Force
1985 deaths
People from Mapleton, Iowa
1923 births
United States Army Air Forces soldiers
United States Army soldiers
Neurological disease deaths in Maryland
Deaths from motor neuron disease